Steve Griffiths (born 30 June 1964) is a Jamaican sprinter. He competed in the men's 4 × 400 metres relay at the 1984 Summer Olympics. Griffiths finished sixth in the 400 metres at the 1983 Pan American Games.

References

1964 births
Living people
Athletes (track and field) at the 1984 Summer Olympics
Jamaican male sprinters
Olympic athletes of Jamaica
Athletes (track and field) at the 1983 Pan American Games
Pan American Games competitors for Jamaica
Place of birth missing (living people)